Edlin Névé is a névé at the south side of Mount Sturm in the Bowers Mountains of Victoria Land, Antarctica. Several glaciers, including the Carryer, Irwin, McLin and Graveson, are nourished by this névé. it was named by the New Zealand Geological Survey Antarctic Expedition, 1967–68, for George Robert Edlin 1921-1992, who served as the first postmaster at Scott Base and assisted in the field during this expedition. This glaciological feature lies situated on the Pennell Coast, a portion of Antarctica lying between Cape Williams and Cape Adare.

References 

Snow fields of the Ross Dependency
Landforms of Victoria Land
Pennell Coast
Névés of Antarctica